Clare Daly (born 16 April 1968) is an Irish politician who has been a Member of the European Parliament (MEP) from Ireland for the Dublin constituency since July 2019. She is a member of Independents 4 Change, part of The Left in the European Parliament – GUE/NGL.

In the 1980s Daly was a member of the Labour Party as a teenager but was expelled alongside other members after being accused of being Trotskyists infiltrating the party using the tactic of entryism. She was subsequently a founding member of "Militant Labour", later known as the Socialist Party. In 1999 she was elected to Fingal County Council, a position she held for 12 years. Daly was elected as a Socialist Party TD for the Dublin North constituency at the 2011 general election. 

Since 2012, Daly has formed a close political association with Mick Wallace. After Wallace was condemned by left-wing TDs following the revelation his building company had avoided €2.1 million in taxes, Daly resigned from the Socialist Party in August 2012 in protest and redesignated herself as a United Left Alliance TD, before switching party again in 2015 to her current party Independents 4 Change. Since becoming an MEP, Daly has gained international attention for her foreign policy views, particularly regarding Russia and China, which have been the subject of controversy and criticism.

Early life
Daly is from Newbridge, County Kildare. Her father, Kevin Daly, was a colonel in the Irish Army, where he was Director of Signals. She is an atheist, while her brother and an uncle are Catholic priests. Daly studied accountancy at Dublin City University (DCU). She was twice elected president of the Students' Union and was active in the students' movement as a campaigner for abortion rights and information. On leaving college she took a job in the catering section of Aer Lingus on a low wage, and became SIPTU's shop steward at Dublin Airport when the airline was engaged in extensive cost-cutting and outsourcing.

Political career
Daly initially joined the Labour Party, where she was elected to the party's Administrative Committee as a youth representative. A member of Labour's Militant Tendency, she was expelled from the party in 1989 alongside Joe Higgins and other supporters of the faction. At first calling themselves Militant Labour, in 1996 they formed the Socialist Party.

County councillor
Daly was elected as a Fingal County Councillor for the Swords area in the 1999 local elections. She was re-elected at the 2004 local elections and the 2009 local elections, topping the poll on each occasion.

In 2003, Daly was jailed for a month, alongside 21 others from the Anti-Bin Tax Campaign for breaching a High Court order preventing protests leading to obstruction of the council's non-collection policy for those not paying bin charges. in 2011, she announced that she would not register to pay a new household charge brought in as part of the latest austerity budget, calling it "reprehensible", and telling Phil Hogan, the minister responsible, in the Dáil: "You can't bring everyone to court". She was an organiser of the Anti-Water charges campaign in Swords in 2014.

She first ran for a seat in Dáil Éireann at the 1997 general election, receiving 7.2% on that occasion and 8.2% at the 1998 Dublin North by-election. At the 2002 general election she received 5,501 votes (12.5%), narrowly missing a seat. At the 2007 general election she received 9% of the vote.

Teachta Dála
She was eventually elected to Dáil Éireann at the 2011 general election, taking 15.2% of the first preference vote. During the presidential election campaign later that year, Daly and Higgins committed themselves to supporting the nomination of independent candidate David Norris in his search for the 20 Oireachtas members necessary for inclusion on the ballot paper.

In February 2012, it was reported that she would introduce a bill to provide for limited access to abortion where there is “real and substantial risk to the life” of the pregnant woman, in line with the X Case. The bill was defeated before its second reading on 19 April 2012.

In 2012, Daly used travel expenses to cover expenses related to her attendance at anti-household charge meetings around the country. Daly said that legal advice was being sought as there was a lack of clarity around the issue and that she would refund any money that was used inappropriately.

In June of that same year, Daly refused to call for the resignation of her friend and political ally, Mick Wallace in the wake of his VAT controversy. It was reported by the Evening Herald that the United Left Alliance, of which the Socialist Party was part, were to confront her over this stance. Daly resigned from the Socialist Party on 31 August 2012. In a statement, the Socialist Party said "it believed Ms Daly had resigned because she placed more value on her political connection with Independent TD Mick Wallace than on the political positions and work of the Socialist Party." Daly described the claim as "absolute nonsense" and said that she had not called for Wallace's resignation because the Socialist Party had not called for his resignation. She requested a share of the €120,000 Socialist Party's Leaders Allowance to allow her to continue to fund her activities as an Independent TD.

In April 2013, along with another TD, Joan Collins, she founded a new political party called United Left.

Following the 39th G8 summit, Daly accused the Fine Gael-Labour government of “prostituting” the country to US President Barack Obama and criticised what she described as media and political "slobbering" over his wife Michelle and their children during their stay in Ireland. She also called Obama a hypocrite and a war criminal for speaking about peace whilst using drones to bomb foreign civilians and wanting to supply weapons to Syrian rebels. Taoiseach Enda Kenny responded to her comments, saying they were "disgraceful" and "beneath you" and invoked the diaspora and the victims of The Troubles since President Obama has supported peace in Northern Ireland.

In November 2015, in the aftermath of the November 2015 Paris attacks, Simon Coveney of Fine Gael accused Daly of attempting to shift blame for the attacks from the perpetrators and onto France itself and other European countries following comments by Daly. Coveney said: "The suggestion in this House that we should be looking at ourselves to blame for what happened on the streets of Paris is reprehensible.  France has an obligation to defend itself.". Daly countered by criticising Coveney's willingness to send Irish Troops on to Mali as well as by stating "Reference has been made to France being better placed and France having a right to defend its citizens. “Precisely contradictory remarks were made when Russia engaged in the same reprehensible actions by bombing Syria in response to attacks on Russia. The West said Russia should not be doing that because it was endangering its citizens.  That was correct for Russia but it is also correct for France".

In December 2015, Daly along with independent TDs Mick Wallace and Maureen O'Sullivan each put forward offers of a €5,000 surety for a 23-year-old man being prosecuted under terrorism legislation in the Special Criminal Court in Dublin charged with membership of an illegal dissident republican terrorist organisation.

At the 2016 general election, she stood as an Independents 4 Change candidate in the Dublin Fingal constituency, and was elected.

Member of the European Parliament
At the 2019 European Parliament elections, she was elected for the Dublin constituency. She received a final total of 87,770 votes, or 11.6%, and took the third seat.

Nepotism and bullying allegations
In December 2019, the London Times reported Daly had appointed her former husband, Michael Murphy, as a European Parliamentary Assistant. The rules in the European Parliament prohibit the employment of "spouses or stable non-marital partners". Daly previously employed the son of fellow Independents4Change MEP Mick Wallace. The Times described Daly as "one of the busiest Irish members in the European parliament this term". in September 2020 a former parliamentary assistant of Daly's, who had worked for her for over seven years, came forth to accuse her of mistreatment and of having "no respect for workers' rights".

Visit to Iraqi Militia

In April 2021, Daly and Wallace were called "embarrassments to Ireland" by Fianna Fail's Malcolm Byrne after the two MEPs travelled to Iraq and visited the headquarters of the Popular Mobilization Forces, an Iraqi militia supported by Iran. Byrne said "These two MEPs visited a Shiite militant group that has lured gay people to their deaths. As if their support for Lukashenko in Belarus and Hezbollah in Lebanon wasn't not bad enough. They are an embarrassment to Ireland. Seeking to understand issues in a conflict is a good thing, not doing due diligence on a group in advance and allowing themselves to be used as propaganda tools is foolish". Video footage of Wallace and Daly was subsequently posted to YouTube by the Popular Mobilization Forces.

Denouncing White Helmets
In April 2021, Daly raised concerns in the European Parliament about a report by the Organisation for the Prohibition of Chemical Weapons (OPCW) into the 2018 Douma chemical attack. Daly said that "an independent OCPW is absolutely necessary". Fianna Fáil’s Barry Andrews said "During this committee meeting, I am ashamed to say that two Irish MEPs used their platform to progress their conspiracy theory that the White Helmets staged an attack on the civilian population of Douma, Syria. Irish MEPs often work together on important files but I would like to express my revulsion at the likes of this disinformation. Until now, I have been quiet I stand against internal attacks on our democracy. I want to say, not in my name".

Venezuelan election monitoring
In June 2021, Daly and Wallace were among the MEPs censured by the European Parliament's Democracy Support and Election Coordination Group for acting as unofficial election monitors in the December 2020 Venezuelan parliamentary election and April 2021 Ecuadorian general election without a mandate or permission from the EU. Official European overseas trips have been suspended during the COVID-19 pandemic. Daly and Wallace were barred until the end of 2021 from making any election missions. They were warned that any further such action may result in their ejection from the European parliament until the end of their terms in 2024. While MEPs can make personal trips overseas, according to The Irish Times, Daly and Wallace made no mention in their tweets that they were acting in an unofficial capacity.

Daly and Wallace issued a joint statement in response that read: "This is a political stunt by the centre right parties in the European Parliament, and we will be challenging it. These were not ‘fake’ election-observation trips. We made abundantly clear by public announcement at the time that we were not visiting Ecuador or Venezuela with an official election observation mandate." They continued: "Although we regret that the Ecuadorian people did not choose Andrés Arauz as their president, we found the elections to be conducted fairly and impartially, and their results are beyond question." Ecuadorian election officials said that Daly could not be an objective election observer while openly supporting one side, such as Andrés Arauz, over the other.

Both Daly and Wallace have refused to present vaccination certs upon entering the European Parliament, resulting in them being reprimanded by the European Parliament.

Views on Russia
According to The Irish Times, Wallace and Clare Daly's positions caused tensions within The Left in the European Parliament – GUE/NGL. Tensions boiled over when Wallace and Daly tabled amendments in the European Parliament on behalf of the Left group seeking to remove parts of  resolutions about Russia in relation to the shooting down by Russian backed militias in Donetsk of Malaysia Airlines Flight 17. 298 passengers and crew were killed in the incident, 193 of them Dutch.

Daly has attended protests supporting Algirdas Paleckis, a politician convicted of spying on behalf of Russia, and attended court when Paleckis' appeal was being heard. Daly condemned the conviction, describing the case as "frightening" and that the conviction was not based on evidence. She further said that it was “reminiscent of the worst of times in Northern Ireland” and “part of a bigger clampdown on differing views and dissenting voices”.

In late January 2022, Daly described the Russian troop build up on the Ukrainian border as being "clearly defensive" and believed there is "no evidence that Russia has any desire to invade Ukraine, it would be of no benefit to them". In February 2022, shortly before the 2022 Russian invasion of Ukraine, Daly (alongside Mick Wallace) was one of 52 MEPs who voted against providing €1.2 billion in loans to Ukraine, against 598 MEPs in favour. On 2 March 2022, she was one of 13 MEPs who voted against a resolution condemning the Russian invasion of Ukraine. Daly later said that she opposed Russian aggression against Ukraine and had voted against the resolution because it also stated its support for NATO and had called for weapons to be sent to Ukraine. Russian state media subsequently played clips of her criticizing the EU response to the Russian invasion.

On 7 April 2022, Daly spoke in the EU parliament against a call for an economic and financial embargo against Russia. She said the measures would cause economic devastation for the Russian people and would be paid for by Europeans in the form of inflation, energy price increases and a "catastrophic decline in living standards". She compared the EU's actions against Russia with its participation in the US wars in Iraq and Afghanistan and "Saudi Arabia's genocide in Yemen". She said the military–industrial complex was "fanning the flames" of a "proxy war" with Russia because the EU had been "capture[d] by the arms industry".

In July 2022, in light of statements she made on the Russian invasion of Ukraine, Daly was added to a list of public figures accused of spreading Russian propaganda by the Security Service of Ukraine. Daly responded by accusing Ukraine's government of carrying out a "smear campaign.". In October 2022, Daly abstained in a European Parliament vote on a measure that sought to end recognition of Russian travel documents issued in occupied foreign regions. Daly also abstained on an approved January 2023 resolution that looked to establish a war crimes tribunal investigating Russia's invasion of Ukraine. 

In November 2022, Daly voted against a resolution to declare Russia a state sponsor of terrorism. She said that "I condemn Russia's invasion and call for a withdrawal... Even the warhawks in the Biden administration have resisted pressure to designate Russia a 'state sponsor of terrorism,' because doing so would close off options for negotiating humanitarian and peace efforts".

Relationship with the media
A report by The Irish Times in April 2022 described Daly and Wallace's media profile in China, and discussed how since January 2021, Daly had been featured in more Chinese-language news articles than any other Irish person, while Wallace had the second most Chinese-language news articles. In April 2022, Daly and Wallace initiated defamation proceedings against RTÉ.

Nicaragua
On 15 September 2022, she was one of 16 MEPs who voted against condemning President Daniel Ortega of Nicaragua for human rights violations, in particular the arrest of Bishop Rolando Álvarez.

References

External links

1968 births
21st-century women MEPs for the Republic of Ireland
21st-century women Teachtaí Dála
Alumni of Dublin City University
Far-left politics in Ireland
Independent TDs
Independents 4 Change MEPs
Independents 4 Change TDs
Irish Trotskyists
Irish abortion-rights activists
Irish anti-capitalists
Irish anti-war activists
Irish atheists
Irish former Christians
Irish politicians convicted of crimes
Irish socialist feminists
Irish tax resisters
Irish women activists
Irish women's rights activists
Labour Party (Ireland) politicians
Living people
Local councillors in Fingal
MEPs for the Republic of Ireland 2019–2024
Members of the 31st Dáil
Members of the 32nd Dáil
People from Newbridge, County Kildare
Politicians from County Kildare
Socialist Party (Ireland) TDs
United Left (Ireland) politicians
Former Roman Catholics